Regional League Championships are contested by the five regional league winners of the 3rd level championships of Thailand.

Five teams meet on a home and away basis, with the top three teams getting promotion to the Thai 1st Division.

History

The 1st ever edition was played in 2009 by the following regional league winners; Chiangrai United, Raj Pracha-Nonthaburi, Narathiwat, Loei City and Samut Prakan.

Raj Pracha-Nonthaburi duly won the first ever championship and were followed by early pace setters Chiangrai United, who tended to stall once promotion was achieved and deep south team Narathiwat who claimed promotion in the deciding game in a 0-0 draw with Samut Prakan who also could have achieved promotion going into the last match day.

Timeline

Seasons

Championship History

1
Sports leagues established in 2009
2009 establishments in Thailand